International volunteering is when volunteers contribute their time to work for organisations or causes outside their respective home countries. International volunteering has a long association with international development, with the aim of bringing benefits to host communities.

Trends show that international volunteering has become increasingly popular across many countries over the past few decades. International volunteering is a broad term which is used to capture multi-year, skilled placements as well as short term roles. The term voluntourism has become common to describe certain types of volunteering organised by governments, charities and travel agents.

History

On a large scale, workcamps after World War I and early missionary service were the first expressions of international service. Formal overseas volunteering can be traced back over one hundred years to when the British Red Cross set up the Voluntary Aid Detachment (VAD) scheme in 1909. The VAD volunteers, as well as volunteers from many other national Red Cross organisations, worked in battlefields across Europe and the Middle East during World War I to treat soldiers and civilians regardless of the side they fought for. One of the most prominent organisations, Service Civil International, organised workcamps from 1920 on as a form of post-war reconciliation and was formally established in 1934.

Up to the mid-20th century overseas volunteering projects were mainly undertaken by people with direct connections to a particular cause and were considered more as short term in nature. The more formal inception of international volunteering organisations can be linked to organisations such as Australian Volunteers International (formerly the Volunteer Graduate Scheme) which formed in 1951, International Voluntary Services in 1953 in the United States, and Voluntary Services Overseas (VSO) in 1958 the United Kingdom. These services and that of the U.S. Peace Corps, established in 1961 during the Kennedy administration, paved the way for broader recognition of overseas volunteering in later years. During the 1960s and 1970s a movement of volunteerism and study abroad programs became popular among university students and graduates and the United Nations launched the UN Volunteers programme for young professionals to take part in a long-term (two year plus) overseas programme.

In recent years the accessibility of international volunteering for US Americans has increased significantly with many smaller charities connecting volunteers with non-governmental organisations in developing countries. About half of all international volunteering from the US takes place through faith-based organizations. For-profit travel companies have also increasingly been offering paid-for volunteering opportunities, this growth coincided with the increasing number of young people taking gap years and has been termed volunteer tourism and voluntourism to denote shorter-term voluntary work that is not necessarily the sole purpose of the trip. However, many opportunities medium- and long-term opportunities for skilled international volunteers remain, for example, the publicised role of volunteers in addressing the Ebola virus epidemic in West Africa. According to US Current Population Survey, the most common activities volunteers engage in abroad include tutoring or teaching, mentoring youth, engaging in general labor, and providing counseling, medical care, or protective services.

Volunteer demographics
Global statistics on international volunteers are unavailable. However, about one million people from the US volunteer abroad each year—almost half for less than two weeks. Shorter-term voluntourism is therefore appealing to many, as it is targeted at travellers who want to make a positive change in the world, while still providing a touristic experience. Volunteering appeals to a broad cross-section of society, but the majority of volunteers are in their twenties and thirties, potentially due to perceptions of volunteering abroad being a more risky activity. The average age of Voluntary Service Overseas (VSO) volunteers, however, is 38, showing a broad range of participation across age groups. Recently there has been an increase in baby boomer volunteers. One possible explanation for the increase is that these people are transitioning into a new stage of life and their focus may shift toward finding activities that give their life new meaning. As with domestic volunteering, international volunteering is more common among those with a higher education and from higher income households. Volunteering Solutions on the other hand has an average age of 20 and also has 80% female solo travellers traveling abroad year year.

Critiques and challenges

Certain critiques and challenges are associated with international volunteering.

Outcomes
Measuring the outcomes of international volunteering is an ongoing challenge. Sometimes the costs invested in these partnerships are high. The intangible nature of impact and outcomes is hard to measure and research has been proposed in this area. Similarly, how to measure the success of a volunteer and the supporting organisation's performance is complicated. To allow volunteers to integrate properly into the community, it is essential that volunteers have some useful skills and are reasonably well-informed and trained before the placement. Shannon O'Donnell, a vocal critic of poorly designed international programs, contends that many volunteer organizations compromise the dignity of local populations—these programs often foster a cyclical dependency international volunteers within the communities the programs are designed to serve. Others have critiqued the mixing of models of volunteering designed for international understanding and those designed for social or economic development. Still others are concerned about its postcolonial and historical character, and the impacts this has on the identity of members of hosting communities.

High costs
Related to the impact of international volunteering, the cost of having an international volunteer has been cited as another area of concern, especially costs for air tickets, allowances (such as for housing and food), insurance, training and logistics. Local staff do not require long-distance travel costs, although they do require payment, and the local organisations could put these funds into other activities; however, many volunteers pay these expenses personally. Some institutions provide scholarships for international volunteering.

Still, volunteers are often cheaper than other forms of long-term technical assistance because they live and work under local conditions. Expatriates who work in the same capacity can be paid multiple times more than any allowances volunteers receive (if any). The cost-benefit of international volunteers is hard to quantify, though studies have highlighted improvements in well-being and inter-cultural understanding in communities and schools as a result of international exchanges and volunteers.

Undermining local organizations

One consideration is that volunteers may dominate the local workplace, replace local employment, and undermine management and work culture especially in small organisations and schools. This is due to volunteers often being considered more highly educated than local staff, even if they do not often have much direct experience.

Coming from a different culture can also lead to volunteers imposing their values on organisations. For example, different cultures have different ideas on whether it is more important to finish a project by a deadline, or to be active in the social life of the community, and a person who values punctuality may be annoyed that work stops for a funeral, while the person who values the community may be annoyed at the heartless-seeming person who wants to skip the funeral.  Similarly, different cultures have different values about some business matters, with differing ideas about where the line is drawn between impermissible levels of nepotism and building valuable relationships and endorsements.  Volunteers are often trained to respect the local working culture and ethics.

Since they report directly to local organisations, they can (and sometimes do) have their contracts terminated if they break any local regulations, which helps to reduce concerns of domination.

Low skills and experience

Young and inexperienced international volunteers sometimes do not have the correct skillset to achieve the project goal. While this may be fine for volunteer workcamps and volunteer trips designed around enhancing international and intercultural understanding, it is a significant problem for international development volunteering (IDV). On the other hand, many of the most prominent international volunteer cooperation organizations (IVCOs) – especially those funded by governments – have minimal educational and skill requirements.

Poor understandings of local context 
International volunteers from outside the host community can lack an understanding of the local context. While there is often a vetting or selection process for volunteers before they are recruited to serve in developing countries, this process has at times been found wanting. Large international volunteer cooperation organizations (IVCOs) provide their volunteers with significant training before and often their placement, which can help address this deficit. On the other hand, countless smaller and for-profit IVCOs offering unskilled volunteer placements to any participant willing to pay the placement fee rarely provide the type of training and preparation that volunteers need to be successful and helpful in hosting communities. In these circumstances, there is conflict about whether the fees volunteers pay justify the time spent supervising and revising their work, and if a sufficient portion of the fees make it back to the local communities hosting volunteers who are typically responsible for their supervision and training.

Neo-colonialism 
There have been allegations from some quarters of neo-colonial advances disguised as an effort to tackle poverty, as some volunteer organisations are connected to national governments, e.g. the Peace Corps, which was set up by the American government. Despite this challenge, most volunteer organisations are non-governmental (NGOs) and are not influenced by government policies. The present structures of international volunteering are also often aimed at impacts on a local, community scale which is sharply in contrast with the macro-political government strategies of the colonial era.

However, many academic journals elaborate that volunteers often have little knowledge or expertise in the work they do when volunteering abroad. This has raised concerns of its value. Frances Brown and Derek Hall write that this creates a neo-colonial narrative; they say the volunteer perspective is framed around the idea that Westerners with minimal experience can effect change in the Global South, just by nature of being from the West. This perpetuates the narrative of Western domination in a post-colonial world, and the need to "save" and "help" the Global South.

Motivations of volunteers 
People volunteer for many reasons, but seldom does anyone volunteer strictly for monetary reasons, as very few organisations offer a stipend for volunteering. More compelling motives include experiencing another culture, meeting new people, and advancing one's career prospects. Such motivations are common among younger volunteers who are looking for experience or direction in their careers. People generally volunteer in order to increase their international awareness, to contextualize poverty and its effects, as an education opportunity, and to help people while having a morally rewarding experience. Many believe that the trip will change the way they think when they return home. However, others are just looking to give to others and do not believe that their experience will cause them to think twice about their lives back home. Many participants use these trips to boost their resumes, travel with friends, gain world experience, and see new countries.

A common motivation is to "make a difference" and to "achieve something positive for others" who are less fortunate than the volunteer. Many volunteers tend to concur that there are disadvantaged people in their home countries, but the scale of disadvantage outside their home countries is felt to be greater. Volunteering at home may elicit images of helping the less fortunate, or campaigning with a local pressure group. Volunteering abroad has tended to be associated with international development and bridging the divide between the rich and poor worlds. Volunteering abroad often seems a more worthy contribution in this context to the volunteers than work in their own country. This perspective is particularly true of volunteers who are older and looking for something more value-based as they near the end of their professional careers or after their children have left home.

It is argued that volunteers are categorized by their motivation “based on six main criteria: destination, duration of project, focus of experience (self-interest versus altruistic), qualifications, active versus passive participation, and level of  contribution to locals. Certain data has encouraged researchers to propose a conceptual structure of volunteers’, classifying them as shallow, intermediate, and deep. The latter represented those who are prone to volunteer due to the hosting communities' needs, suggesting an authentic motivation of wanting to provide aid where it's needed. A shallow and intermediate volunteer is more so dominated by personal interests, with intermediate suggesting both altruistic and authentic motives.

Voluntourism (aka volunteer tourism)

Definition 
Volunteer tourism, also known as "voluntourism", is a specific kind of international volunteering. It is a relatively new concept, combining the nonprofit sector and the tourism sector. Essentially, it is a form of international traveling to resource poor settings, with a primary purpose of volunteering and serving the host community. Voluntourism activities are generally temporary attempts to address education, health, environmental and economic issues. Ideally, voluntourism activities are conducted by non-profit organizations for the purpose of societal good, and poses a chance for volunteers to help and benefit others in an unconventional setting with their skills. Those activities are characterized by the age of the participants, and by the length of time they volunteer abroad. Participants are often young adults (ages 15–30), the length of the trip is often categorized as short term (under three months), and the volunteering is regularly packaged with adventure and travel activities. Voluntourism has undergone intense scrutiny over the course of the 2000s, and an increasing number of academic papers question volunteer tourists' motivations and experiences.

Growth of voluntourism 
As a variation of international volunteering, voluntourism's development can be traced back to over a century ago. According to National Public Radio, it is one of the most rapid growing trends in modern travel, with more than 1.6 million volunteer-tourists spending around two billion dollars each year.

Criticisms 
Voluntourism programs are more often conducted by profit-making companies rather than charities. Although the intention for volunteers to travel is to empower the local communities, the ultimate motivation of the volunteers is more self-serving. According to a study done by Rebecca Tiessen, the motivations identified by the participants generally fit under the category of personal growth (e.g. skill development, cross-cultural understanding, career choice, etc.), while motivations related to having a positive social impact or desire for social justice in the host communities was not found among the participants, reflecting a one-directional flow of benefits from the host communities to the volunteers. With this trend, communities, journalists, and those who have actually done volunteer activities start to question to which extent voluntourism activities can actually help with the local condition, or will they actually bring harm to the already underprivileged places.

Volunteer-sending organizations, such as Free The Children's Me to We trips, the British company Projects-abroad, and AIESEC, have been critiqued as furthering the aforementioned neo-colonial narrative to youth. The increased prevalence of promotional material regarding trips to "help" the Global South has "increased media exposure in the Global North to poverty in the Global South." Critics argue that the way in which these organizations advertise their trips stigmatizes and frames the developing world as helpless. This plays into Maria Eriksson Baaz's theories in the book Paternalism of Partnership: a Postcolonial Reading of Identity in Development Aid, in which she discusses discourse that frames the volunteer as a developed, paternalistic individual and the donor as underdeveloped. The framing and "othering" of cultures outside the West and Global North can also be found in Edward Said's text, Orientalism. His theory is rooted in the same idea, in which he describes West's patronizing portrayals of the East.

Other criticisms of the voluntourism industry are that not only are short-term volunteers often untrained in the projects they participate in (building schools, health centres, wells), but that projects can fuel conflict among communities, offer bandaid solutions, replace work locals could be doing, and reinforce neoliberal policies. Interactions with children are highly popular amongst voluntourism programs. As a consequence, children in these communities may become dependent and commodified when volunteers are constantly arriving and departing every couple weeks. Orphanage volunteering is also an emerging program, which can fuel human trafficking or child abuse in the host communities, and harm the children's development - according to UNICEF, in Nepal, 85% of all children living in orphanages has at least one living parent. The rhetoric of such volunteer-sending organizations has also been argued to inform a "consumer-capitalist" culture that plays to the wants and needs of the privileged North, at the disadvantage of the Global South.

See also
Career-oriented social networking market
InterVol
Kibbutz volunteers
Peace Corps
Service learning
Virtual volunteering
Voluntary Service Overseas

References

International relations
Types of tourism
Volunteering